Laura Garrone (born 15 November 1967) is a former professional tennis player from Italy.

In her career, Garrone won five doubles titles on the WTA Tour. The right-hander reached her career-high ranking of world No. 32 on 19 January 1987. Her best Grand Slam finish was the fourth round at the 1986 French Open at Roland Garros.

WTA career finals

Doubles: 6 (5 titles, 1 runner-up)

ITF Circuit finals

Singles: 5 (4–1)

Doubles: 7 (5–2)

External links
 
 
 

1967 births
Living people
Italian female tennis players
Tennis players from Milan
US Open (tennis) junior champions
Grand Slam (tennis) champions in girls' singles
Mediterranean Games silver medalists for Italy
Mediterranean Games bronze medalists for Italy
Mediterranean Games medalists in tennis
Competitors at the 1983 Mediterranean Games
20th-century Italian women
21st-century Italian women